Anne Ruth Semple (June 9, 1900 – October 25, 1987) was a Native American writer and professor and the fifth poet laureate of the state of Oklahoma; appointed in 1945 by Governor Robert S. Kerr. 
Semple earned her Ph.D. from Oklahoma Agricultural and Mechanical College, which is now Oklahoma State University, with a dissertation on the history of Oklahoma Presbyterian College. She was a professor of Education at Southeastern Oklahoma State University from at least 1947 until 1965.

Semple was the great granddaughter of Peter Pitchlynn (Snapping Turtle), who served as chief of the Choctaw nation in the 1860s, and sister to William Finley Semple who served as chief of the Choctaw nation from 1918 to 1922. 
She's buried in Gethsemane Cemetery in Caddo, Oklahoma.

Bibliography 
 Prairie-Born: A Book of Verse. Dallas: Kaleidograph, 1942.
 Ties that Bind: The Story of Oklahoma Presbyterian College. 1957

See also 

 Poets Laureate of Oklahoma

References 

1900 births
1987 deaths
Poets Laureate of Oklahoma